The larch pug (Eupithecia lariciata) is a moth of the family Geometridae. The species can be found in Europe, the Ural Mountains, West and Central Siberia, the Altai Mountains, Transbaikalia, Yakutia, the Far East, Mongolia, Korea, Japan and in North America, from Yukon and Newfoundland to New York and Arizona.

The wingspan is 19–22 mm. The length of the forewings is 10–12 mm. The ground colour of the forewings is whitish grey with dark crosslines. The median crossline is sharply angulated. There is a series of small dark stains on the costal margin and tuft of white hairs on the thorax. The hindwings are whitish grey with a small dark spot in the tornal area.
The larva can be quite variable - brown or green, with or without light longitudinal stripes, with or without a number of bell-shaped dark spots along the back.

The moths fly in one generation from May to June. They are attracted to light.

The caterpillars feed on larch.

Subspecies
Eupithecia lariciata mesodeicta was raised to species rank in 2008.

References

External links

Larch pug on UKmoths
Lepiforum.de
Vlindernet.nl 

Eupithecia
Moths described in 1842
Moths of Asia
Moths of Europe
Moths of North America
Taxa named by Christian Friedrich Freyer